In Western musical theory, a cadence (Latin cadentia, "a falling") is the end of a phrase in which the melody or harmony creates a sense of full or partial resolution, especially in music of the 16th century onwards. A harmonic cadence is a progression of two or more chords that concludes a phrase, section, or piece of music. A rhythmic cadence is a characteristic rhythmic pattern that indicates the end of a phrase. A cadence can be labeled  "weak" or "strong" depending on the impression of finality it gives. While cadences are usually classified by specific chord or melodic progressions, the use of such progressions does not necessarily constitute a cadence—there must be a sense of closure, as at the end of a phrase. Harmonic rhythm plays an important part in determining where a cadence occurs.

Cadences are strong indicators of the tonic or central pitch of a passage or piece. The musicologist Edward Lowinsky proposed that the cadence was the "cradle of tonality".

US and British nomenclature 
Cadence names may differ between US usage and British usage. This article follows US usage.

Common classifications
Cadences are divided into four main types, according to their harmonic progression: authentic (typically perfect authentic or imperfect authentic), half, plagal, and deceptive. Typically, phrases end on authentic or half cadences, and the terms plagal and deceptive refer to motion that avoids or follows a phrase-ending cadence. Each cadence can be described using the Roman numeral system of naming chords.

Authentic cadence
An authentic cadence is a cadence from the dominant chord (V) to the root chord (I). A seventh above the root may be added to create a dominant seventh chord (V7), and the dominant chord may be preceded by a cadential  chord. The Harvard Concise Dictionary of Music and Musicians says, "This cadence is a microcosm of the tonal system, and is the most direct means of establishing a pitch as tonic. It is virtually obligatory as the final structural cadence of a tonal work." Authentic cadences are generally classified as either perfect or imperfect. The phrase perfect cadence is sometimes used as a synonym for authentic cadence but can also have a more precise meaning depending on the chord voicing.

Perfect authentic cadence
In a perfect authentic cadence (PAC), the chords are in root position – that is, the roots of both chords are in the bass – and the tonic is in the highest voice of the final chord. This is generally considered the strongest type of cadence and often found at structurally defining moments. Music theorist William Caplin writes that the perfect authentic cadence "achieves complete harmonic and melodic closure."

Imperfect authentic cadence

There are three types of imperfect authentic cadences (IAC):

Root position IAC (shown below): Similar to a perfect authentic cadence, but the highest voice is not the tonic.

Inverted IAC: Similar to a perfect authentic cadence, but one or both chords are inverted.
Leading-tone IAC: The penultimate (V) chord is replaced with a chord based on the leading-tone (viio chord).

Evaded cadence

An evaded cadence moves from a dominant seventh third inversion chord (V) to a first inversion tonic chord (I). Because the seventh must fall stepwise, it forces the cadence to resolve to the less stable first inversion chord. To achieve this, a root position V usually changes to a V right before resolution, thereby "evading" the cadence. (See also inverted cadence below.)

Half cadence
A half cadence (also called an imperfect cadence or semicadence) is any cadence ending on V, whether preceded by II (V of V), ii, vi, IV, or I—or any other chord. Because it sounds incomplete or suspended, the half cadence is considered a weak cadence that calls for continuation.

Several types of half cadences are described below.

Phrygian half cadence

A Phrygian half cadence is a half cadence iv6–V in minor, so named because the semitonal motion in the bass (sixth degree to fifth degree) resembles the half-step heard in the ii–I of the 15th-century cadence in the Phrygian mode. Due to its being a survival from modal Renaissance harmony this cadence gives an archaic sound, especially when preceded by v (v–iv6–V). A characteristic gesture in Baroque music, the Phrygian cadence often concluded a slow movement immediately followed by a faster one. With the addition of motion in the upper part to the sixth degree, it becomes the Landini cadence.

Lydian cadence
A Lydian cadence is similar to the Phrygian half cadence, involving iv6–V in the minor. The difference is that in the Lydian cadence, the whole iv6 is raised by a half step. In other words, the Phrygian half cadence begins with the first chord built on scale degree , while the Lydian half cadence is built on the scale degree .

Burgundian cadences
Burgundian cadences became popular in Burgundian music. Note the parallel fourths between the upper voices.

Plagal half cadence
The rare plagal half cadence involves a I–IV progression. Like an authentic cadence (V–I), the plagal half cadence involves an ascending fourth (or, by inversion, a descending fifth). The plagal half cadence is a weak cadence, ordinarily at the ending of an antecedent phrase, after which a consequent phrase commences. One example of this use is in "Auld Lang Syne". But in one very unusual occurrence – the end of the exposition of the first movement of Brahms' Clarinet Trio, Op. 114—it is used to complete not just a musical phrase but an entire section of a movement.

Plagal cadence

A plagal cadence is a cadence from IV to I. It is also known as the Amen cadence because of its frequent setting to the text "Amen" in hymns.

Minor plagal cadence 
A minor plagal cadence, also known as a perfect plagal cadence, uses the minor iv instead of a major IV. With a very similar voice leading to a perfect cadence, the minor plagal cadence is a strong resolution to the tonic.

Moravian cadence
The Moravian cadence, which can be found in the works of Leoš Janáček and Bohuslav Martinů amongst others, is a form of plagal cadence in which the outer notes of the first chord each  move inwards by a tone to the second.   (IVadd6 → I6). An early suggestion of the Moravian cadence in classical music occurs in Antonín Dvořák’s New World Symphony.

Deceptive cadence

"A cadence is called 'interrupted', 'deceptive' or 'false' where the penultimate, dominant chord is not followed by the expected tonic, but by another one, often the submediant." This is the most important irregular resolution, most commonly V7–vi (or V7–VI) in major or V7–VI in minor. This is considered a weak cadence because of the "hanging" (suspended) feeling it invokes.

At the beginning of the final movement of Gustav Mahler's 9th Symphony, the listener hears a string of many deceptive cadences progressing from V to IV6.

One of the most striking uses of this cadence is in the A-minor section at the end of the exposition in the first movement of Brahms' Third Symphony. The music progresses to an implied E minor dominant (B7) with a rapid chromatic scale upwards but suddenly sidesteps to C major. The same device is used again in the recapitulation; this time the sidestep is—as one would expect—to F major, the tonic key of the whole Symphony.

The interrupted cadence is also frequently used in popular music. For example, the Pink Floyd song "Bring the Boys Back Home" ends with such a cadence (at approximately 0:45–50).

Other classifications

Inverted cadence
An inverted cadence (also called a medial cadence) inverts the last chord. It may be restricted only to the perfect and imperfect cadence, or only to the perfect cadence, or it may apply to cadences of all types. To distinguish them from this form, the other, more common forms of cadences listed above are known as radical cadences.

Rhythmic classifications

Cadences can also be classified by their rhythmic position:

 A metrically accented cadence occurs on a strong position, typically the downbeat of a measure.
 A metrically unaccented cadence occurs in a metrically weak position, for instance, after a long appoggiatura.

Metrically accented cadences are considered stronger and are generally of greater structural significance. In the past, the terms masculine and feminine were sometimes used to describe rhythmically "strong" or "weak" cadences, but this terminology is no longer acceptable to some. Susan McClary has written extensively on the gendered terminology of music and music theory in her book Feminine Endings.

The example below shows a metrically unaccented cadence (IV–V–I). The final chord is postponed to fall on a weak beat.

Picardy third
A Picardy third (or Picardy cadence) is a harmonic device that originated in Western music in the Renaissance era. It refers to the use of a major chord of the tonic at the end of a musical section that is either modal or in a minor key. The example below shows a picardy third in the final chord, from J.S. Bach's Jesu, meine Freude (Jesus, My Joy), mm. 12–13.

Upper leading-tone cadence

The example below shows a cadence featuring an upper leading-tone from a well-known 16th-century lamentation, the debate over which was documented in Rome c. 1540. The final three written notes in the upper voice are B–C–D, in which case a trill on C produces D. However, convention implied a C, and a cadential trill of a whole tone on the second to last note produces D/E, the upper leading-tone of D. Presumably, the debate was over whether to use C–D or C–D for the trill.

In medieval and Renaissance polyphony
Medieval and Renaissance cadences are based upon dyads rather than chords. The first theoretical mention of cadences comes from Guido of Arezzo's description of the occursus in his Micrologus, where he uses the term to mean where the two lines of a two-part polyphonic phrase end in a unison.

Clausula vera 

A clausula or clausula vera ("true close") is a dyadic or intervallic, rather than chordal or harmonic, cadence. In a clausula vera, two voices approach an octave or unison through stepwise motion in contrary motion.

In three voices, the third voice often adds a falling fifth creating a cadence similar to the authentic cadence in tonal music.

According to Carl Dahlhaus, "as late as the 13th century the half step was experienced as a problematic interval not easily understood, as the remainder between the perfect fourth and the ditone:

In a melodic half step, listeners of the time perceived no tendency of the lower tone toward the upper, or the upper toward the lower. The second tone was not the 'goal' of the first. Instead, musicians avoided the half step in clausulas because, to their ears, it lacked clarity as an interval. Beginning in the 13th century, cadences begin to require motion in one voice by half step and the other a whole step in contrary motion.

Plagal cadence 
A plagal cadence was found occasionally as an interior cadence, with the lower voice in two-part writing moving up a perfect fifth or down a perfect fourth.

Pause 
A pause in one voice may also be used as a weak interior cadence. The example below, Lassus's Qui vult venire post me, mm. 3–5, shows a pause in the third measure.

Evaded cadence 
In counterpoint, an evaded cadence is one where one of the voices in a suspension does not resolve as expected, and the voices together resolved to a consonance other than an octave or unison (a perfect fifth, a sixth, or a third).

Corelli cadence 
The Corelli cadence, or Corelli clash, named for its association with the violin music of the Corelli school, is a cadence characterized by a major and/or minor second clash between the tonic and the leading-tone or the tonic and supertonic. An example is shown below.

English cadence 
Another "clash cadence", the English cadence, is a contrapuntal pattern particular to the authentic or perfect cadence. It features the blue seventh against the dominant chord, which in the key of C would be B and G–B–D. Popular with English composers of the High Renaissance and Restoration periods in the 16th and 17th centuries, the English cadence is described as sounding archaic or old-fashioned. It was first given its name in the 20th century.

The hallmark of this device is the dissonant augmented octave (compound augmented unison) produced by a false relation between the split seventh scale degree, as shown below in an excerpt from O sacrum convivium by Thomas Tallis. The courtesy accidental on the tenor's G is editorial.

Landini cadence 
A Landini cadence (also known as a Landini sixth, Landini sixth cadence, or under-third cadence) is a cadence that was used extensively in the 14th and early 15th century. It is named after Francesco Landini, a composer who used them profusely. Similar to a clausula vera, it includes an escape tone in the upper voice, which briefly narrows the interval to a perfect fifth before the octave.

Common practice period
The classical and romantic periods of musical history provide many examples of the way the different cadences are used in context.

Authentic cadences and half cadences
Mozart’s Romanze from his Piano Concerto No. 20 follows a familiar pattern of a pair of phrases, one ending with a half (imperfect) cadence and the other with an authentic cadence:The presto movement from Beethoven’s String Quartet Op 130 follows the same pattern, but in a minor key:

Plagal cadences
The Hallelujah Chorus from Handel’s Messiah culminates powerfully with an iterated plagal cadence:Debussy’s prelude ‘La Fille aux Cheveux de Lin’ contains a plagal cadence in its 2nd and 3rd bars : One of the most famous endings in all music is found in the concluding bars of Wagner’s opera Tristan und Isolde, where the dissonant chord in the opening phrase of the opera is finally resolved "three enormous acts and five hours later" in the form of a minor plagal cadence:

Deceptive cadences
In Bach's harmonization of the chorale ‘Wachet auf’, a phrase ending in a deceptive cadence repeats with the cadence changed to an authentic one: The exposition of the first movement of Beethoven’s Piano Sonata No. 21 (The Waldstein Sonata), Op. 53 features a minor key passage where an authentic (perfect) cadence precedes a deceptive (interrupted) one:

Dvořák’s Slavonic Dance, Op. 72, No. 2 features deceptive (interrupted), half (imperfect) and authentic (perfect) cadences within its first sixteen bars:
Debussy's Prelude “La fille aux cheveux de lin” (see also above) concludes with a passage featuring a deceptive (interrupted) cadence that progresses, not from V–VI, but from V–IV:

Some varieties of deceptive cadence that go beyond the usual V–VI pattern lead to some startling effects. For example, a particularly dramatic and abrupt deceptive cadence occurs in the second Presto movement of Beethoven’s Piano Sonata No. 30, Op. 109, bars 97–112, "a striking passage that used to pre-occupy [music] theorists". The music at this point is in B minor, and carries the expectation is that the chord of F sharp (Chord V) will be followed by the tonic chord of B. However, "Dynamics become softer and softer; dominant and tonic chords of B minor appear isolated on the first beat of a bar, separated by silences: until in sudden fortissimo ... the recapitulation bursts on us in the tonic E minor, the B minor dominants left unresolved."

An equally startling example occurs in J.S. Bach's Toccata and Fugue in F major, BWV 540:

According to Richard Taruskin, in this Toccata, "the already much-delayed resolution is thwarted (m204) by what was the most spectacular 'deceptive cadence' anyone had composed as of the second decade of the eighteenth century ... producing an especially pungent effect." Hermann Keller describes the effect of this cadence as follows: "the splendour of the end with the famous third inversion of the seventh chord, who would not be enthralled by that?"

Chopin's Fantaisie, Op. 49, composed over a century later in 1841, features a similar harmonic jolt:

A deceptive cadence is a useful means for extending a musical narrative. In the closing passage of Bach’s Prelude in F minor from Book II of the Well-Tempered Clavier, the opening theme returns and seems headed towards a possible final resolution on an authentic (perfect) cadence. What the listener may expect is:

Instead, at bar 60, Bach inserts a deceptive cadence (V–VI in F minor), leading to a lengthy digression of some dozen bars before reaching resolution on the final (V–I) cadence.

A similar passage occurs at the conclusion of Mozart's Fantasia in D minor, K397:

Jazz
In jazz, a cadence is often referred to as a turnaround, chord progressions that lead back and resolve to the tonic (for example, the ii–V–I turnaround). Turnarounds may be used at any point and not solely before the tonic.

Half-step cadences are common in jazz if not cliché. For example, the ascending diminished seventh chord half-step cadence, which—using a secondary diminished seventh chord—creates momentum between two chords a major second apart (with the diminished seventh in between).

The descending diminished seventh chord half-step cadence is assisted by two common tones.

Rhythmic cadence
Rhythmic cadences often feature a final note longer than the prevailing note values and this often follows a characteristic rhythmic pattern repeated at the end of the phrase. The example below shows a characteristic rhythmic cadence at the end of the first phrase of J.S. Bach's Brandenburg Concerto No. 3 in G major, BMV 1048, mvmt. I, mm. 1–2:

See also

 Andalusian cadence
 Approach chord
 Cadential six-four
 Coda
 Cadenza
 Drum cadence
 Kadans
 Lament bass
 List of Caribbean music genres: cadence-lypso and cadence rampa
 V–IV–I turnaround
 VII–V7 cadence

References

Sources
 
 
 
 

Jazz terminology
Musical terminology